The 1952 World Table Tennis Championships mixed doubles was the 19th edition of the mixed doubles championship.  

Ferenc Sidó and Angelica Rozeanu defeated Johnny Leach and Diane Rowe in the final by three sets to nil.

Results

See also
List of World Table Tennis Championships medalists

References

-